A pinacol coupling reaction is an organic reaction in which a carbon–carbon bond is formed between the carbonyl groups of an aldehyde or a ketone in presence of an electron donor in a free radical process. The reaction product is a vicinal diol. The reaction is named after pinacol (also known as 2,3-dimethyl-2,3-butanediol or tetramethylethylene glycol), which is the product of this reaction when done with acetone as reagent. The reaction is usually a homocoupling but intramolecular cross-coupling reactions are also possible. Pinacol was discovered by Wilhelm Rudolph Fittig in 1859.

Reaction mechanism
The first step in the reaction mechanism is a one-electron reduction of the carbonyl group by a reducing agent —such as magnesium— to a ketyl radical anion species. Two ketyl groups react in a coupling reaction yielding a vicinal diol with both hydroxyl groups deprotonated. Addition of water or another proton donor gives the diol. With magnesium as an electron donor, the initial reaction product is a 5-membered cyclic compound with the two oxygen atoms coordinated to the oxidized Mg2+ ion. This complex is broken up by addition of water with formation of magnesium hydroxide. The pinacol coupling can be followed up by a pinacol rearrangement. A related reaction is the McMurry reaction, which uses titanium(III) chloride or titanium(IV) chloride in conjunction with a reducing agent for the formation of the metal-diol complex, and which takes place with an additional deoxygenation reaction step in order to provide an alkene product.

Scope
Benzophenone may undergo the pinacol coupling photochemically. Benzaldehyde may also be used as a substrate with the use of catalytic vanadium(III) chloride and aluminium metal as the stoichiometric reductant. This heterogeneous reaction in water at room temperature yields 72% after 3 days with 56:44 dl:meso composition.

In another system with benzaldehyde, Montmorillonite K-10]] and zinc chloride in aqueous THF under ultrasound the reaction time is reduced to 3 hours (composition 55:45). On the other hand, certain tartaric acid derivatives can be obtained with high diastereoselectivity in a system of samarium(II) iodide and HMPA.

A titanium-catalyzed photocatalytic approach was also developed: the use of catalytic titanocene dichloride in the presence of a red-absorbing organic dye as the photosensitizer, and Hantzsch ester as the terminal reducing agent, enabled the homocoupling reactions of a wide variety of aromatic aldehydes in trifluorotoluene under orange-light irradiation, with high yields and diastereoselectivities (more than 20:1 dl:meso). An enantioselective version (up to 92% e.e.), using catalytic amounts of a chiral titanium salen, was also developed.

Two examples of pinacol coupling used in total synthesis are the Mukaiyama Taxol total synthesis and the Nicolaou Taxol total synthesis.

p-Hydroxypropiophenone is used as the substrate in the synthesis of diethylstilbestrol.

An unsymmetrical pinacol coupling reaction between para-chloro-acetophenone and acetone was employed to give phenaglycodol in a 40% yield.

References

Further reading 

Addition reactions
Free radical reactions
Carbon-carbon bond forming reactions
1859 in science